Henry Roberts (1862 – 1 January 1949) was a New Zealand rugby union player. A halfback, Roberts represented Wellington and Canterbury at a provincial level, and was a member of the first New Zealand national side, the All Blacks, in 1884. He played seven matches for the All Blacks, none of them internationals. His son Teddy, also a halfback, was a member of the All Blacks in 1913, making them the team's first father–son representatives.

Following the death of James O'Donnell in 1942, Roberts held the distinction of being the oldest living All Black.

Roberts also played first-class cricket for Wellington between 1883 and 1890.

References 

1862 births
1949 deaths
Rugby union players from Wellington City
New Zealand international rugby union players
New Zealand cricketers
New Zealand rugby union players
Wellington rugby union players
Canterbury rugby union players
Rugby union scrum-halves
Wellington cricketers